Nigel Ipinson-Fleming (born 1970, Liverpool, England) is a British keyboardist. He has played, written and produced for several acts including Orchestral Manoeuvres in the Dark (OMD), The Stone Roses and Ian Brown.

Career
Ipinson-Fleming started playing piano when he was three years old. He first appeared in the group Juvenile Jazz, which won a 1987 BBC TV talent contest on Saturday Superstore called "Search for a Superstar", and issued a self-titled album the same year. Ipinson later played on the Orchestral Manoeuvres in the Dark albums Sugar Tax (1991) and Liberator (1993), and co-wrote the band's 1996 single, "Walking on the Milky Way".

Ipinson-Fleming assisted The Stone Roses as keyboardist throughout the band's Second Coming Tour of 1995 as well as on festival gigs in the summer of 1996, and appeared on some studio recordings by the group. Ipinson wrote songs for former Stone Roses singer Ian Brown, and also played on other tracks from the singer's debut album Unfinished Monkey Business (1998). In 1999, Ipinson-Fleming became the Managing Director of UKChurches, a multimedia solutions company. He has also performed and written for Hot Chocolate and The Gospel Music Workshop of America, and has worked with many education bodies including St Mary Redcliffe School, Bristol Cathedral School, The Cabot Learning Federation, and Christchurch School Clifton.

References

1970 births
English keyboardists
Musicians from Manchester
Orchestral Manoeuvres in the Dark members
Living people